SevOne is a software company that was founded in 2005. It was named after the slang for the "severity one" performance problems network managers face.

SevOne was acquired by Turbonomic in 2019.  Then as part of Turbonomic, the SevOne product line was acquired in 2021 by IBM, and made available by IBM as IBM SevOne Network Performance Management (NPM).

IBM SevOne NPM provides monitoring and analytics for the digital infrastructure, including networks, servers, and cloud datacenters.

History 

The company was founded in 2005 by computer scientists from the University of Delaware who also served as network architects at leading financial institutions.

In July 2007, venture capital firm Osage Ventures led a Series A Preferred placement in SevOne. In March 2009, Osage led a second round of financing in SevOne along with several private investors.

In January 2013, SevOne announced a $150 million investment from Bain Capital.

In September 2015, SevOne announced a $50 million Series C financing round led by Westfield Capital Management and Bain Capital Ventures. Brookside Capital, HarbourVest, VT Technology Ventures, and Osage Venture Partners also participated in this round.

In November 2019, SevOne was acquired by Turbonomic.

In April 2021, IBM announced it was acquiring Turbonomic, SevOne's parent company.

References 

Networking software companies
Privately held companies based in Delaware
Companies established in 2005
Companies based in Wilmington, Delaware
2005 establishments in Delaware
Software performance management